= Basil Milovsoroff =

Basil Milovsoroff (1906–1992) was an accomplished Russian-American puppeteer. He was born in Siberia, close to the Mongolian border and emigrated to the United States when he was very young. He received a BS and master's degrees from the Oberlin College, and in 1957 he joined the Department of Russian Studies at Dartmouth College.

In 1931 he married Georgia Taylor and together started The Folktale Puppet Theatre. He was widely recognized as one of the best puppeteers in the United States, and in 1983 he received the President's Award of the Puppeteers of America (a year before Frank Oz received it) https://web.archive.org/web/20061001145928/http://www.puppeteers.org/awardshistory.html His puppets can be best described as surrealist compositions of pieces of wood that preserved their original shapes, with their voices having a resemblance to the sounds of the forest.

== Sources ==
- Wallace, Lea. "In Memory of Basil Milovsoroff", Puppetry Journal, Fall 1993, vol.45, No. 1, as cited by "Towards the Future of Puppetry: The Work of Basil Milovsoroff" by Julie Morrison, University of Connecticut 1997.
